Wilk is a surname.

Wilk may also refer to:


In the military
 Wilk class submarine of the Polish Navy
 ORP Wilk (1929), the lead boat of the Wilk class, launched in 1929
ORP Wilk (292), a Polish Foxtrot class submarine, launched in 1987 
 PZL.38 Wilk, prototype of a fighter-bomber
 WKW Wilk, sniper rifle
 T-72 Wilk, a Polish variant of the T-72 tank

Radio stations
 WILK (AM), licensed to Wilkes-Barre, Pennsylvania
 WILK-FM, licensed to Avoca, Pennsylvania

Other uses
 Wilk Elektronik, a Polish computer memory manufacturer
"The Wilk" a colloquial name for the Ernest L. Wilkinson Student Center in Provo, Utah, United States
"General Wilk" (1895–1951), nom de guerre of Aleksander Krzyzanowski

See also
 Wilks (disambiguation)
 Whelk modern spelling of the sea shell Wilk